Chris Garlich (born July 17, 1957) is a former American football linebacker. He played for the St. Louis Cardinals in 1979.

References

1957 births
Living people
American football linebackers
Missouri Tigers football players
St. Louis Cardinals (football) players